Mohammed Faouzi (born 3 September 1987) is a Dutch footballer of Moroccan descent who plays for ONA in the Eerste Klasse.

Club career
Faouzi is a striker who became "Talent of the Year" in the Nike A-juniors Eredivisie in 2006. He played professionally for Excelsior and descended into amateur football playing for the likes of Noordwijk, IJsselmeervogels, SteDoCo and SC Feyenoord before joining Jodan Boys. He returned to his first childhood club ONA in 2018.

Personal life
Faouzi studied law at Leiden University and works as a lawyer.

References

1987 births
Living people
Footballers from Gouda, South Holland
Dutch sportspeople of Moroccan descent
Association football forwards
Dutch footballers
Moroccan footballers
Excelsior Rotterdam players
VV Noordwijk players
IJsselmeervogels players
Eerste Divisie players
Derde Divisie players
21st-century Dutch lawyers
CVV de Jodan Boys players
SC Feyenoord players